Serik Kerimbekuly Konakbaev (Serık Kerımbekūly Qonaqbaev; ; born October 25, 1959 in Pavlodar, Kazakh SSR) is a retired Kazakh amateur boxer, who represented the USSR at the 1980 Summer Olympics in Moscow, Soviet Union. There he won the silver medal in the light welterweight division (– 63.5 kg), after being defeated in the final by Patrizio Oliva of Italy. Two years later he once again captured the silver medal, this time at the World Championships in Munich, West Germany.

Olympics

1980 Olympic results 
 Defeated Simion Cuţov (Romania) by unanimous decision, 5–0
 Defeated Imre Bácskai (Hungary) RET 2
 Defeated José Angel Molina (Puerto Rico) by walkover
 Defeated José Aguilar (Cuba) by majority decision, 4–1
 Lost to Patrizio Oliva (Italy) by majority decision, 1–4

1984 Olympics 

Konakbayev came to attention of Howard Cosell, and after the Soviet Olympic authorities announced the USSR team wouldn't show up at the 1984 Los Angeles Olympics, where Konakbayev had genuine chances to compete for the gold medal at the welterweight event of the Games, Cosell said:

References

External links 
 
 
 Article by Kyle McLachlan (Bad Left Hook, February 15, 2015).

Living people
Soviet male boxers
Light-welterweight boxers
Boxers at the 1980 Summer Olympics
Olympic boxers of the Soviet Union
Olympic silver medalists for the Soviet Union
1959 births
Olympic medalists in boxing
Members of the Mazhilis
Kazakhstani male boxers
People from Pavlodar
AIBA World Boxing Championships medalists
Medalists at the 1980 Summer Olympics
Sportsperson-politicians